Shieldhill may refer to the following places in Scotland:

 Shieldhill, Dumfries and Galloway
 Shieldhill railway station, a former railway station that served Shieldhill, Dumfries and Galloway
 Shieldhill, Falkirk
 Shieldhill, South Lanarkshire, the location of Shieldhill Castle